Balbay is a Turkish surname. Notable people with the surname include:
 Wantan Balbay, a player in Idaho
 Doğuş Balbay (born 1989), Turkish basketball player
 Mustafa Balbay (born 1960), Turkish journalist, writer, and politician

See also
Balbay, Kyrgyzstan

Turkish-language surnames